The 1993 Tooheys 1000 was the 34th running of the Bathurst 1000 touring car race. It was held on 3 October 1993 at the Mount Panorama Circuit just outside Bathurst, New South Wales, Australia. The race was held for cars eligible under CAMS Group 3A Touring Car regulations, which included 5.0 litre V8 engined cars (that later became known as V8Supercars), International Class II 2.0 litre Touring Cars (that later became known as Super Touring cars and naturally aspirated two wheel drive cars complying with 1992 CAMS Group 3A regulations (which had been based on international Group A rules).

Class structure and entry list

Class structure
Class A Over 2000cc
The class later to become known as V8 Supercar, it consisted of V8 Ford Falcons and Holden Commodores with a special dispensation to allow Group A 2.5 litre BMW M3s and a BMW 635CSi to race.

Class B Up to 2000cc
The class later to become known as Super Touring, it consisted of a pair of Toyota Corollas and a Toyota Carina and a group of older modified Group A touring cars, BMW M3s, Ford Sierras and Toyota Corollas.

Entry list
47 cars were entered in the race.

 – Bob Holden and David Sala withdrew separately from Car #13 prior to the race. Sala was replaced with Peter Hopwood.

Results

Top 10 shootout

* Larry Perkins was the only Commodore driver in the runoff to actually have a Holden V8 engine in his car. The rest of the Holden runners had the 5.0L Chevrolet engine in their cars.* David Brabham became the first second generation driver to compete in the runoff, emulating his triple Formula One World Championship winning father Jack who drove in the inaugural Top 10 runoff in 1978. By coincidence, both finished their respective runoffs in 8th position. The younger Brabham also became the 6th ex-F1 driver to qualify for the runoff following Jack Brabham, Derek Bell, Larry Perkins, Johnny Cecotto and Alan Jones.* After the Ford EB Falcons had dominated the first six rounds of the ATCC, CAMS allowed a new aero package for the Holden VP Commodores. At Bathurst this allowed the Commodore runners to qualify almost 3 seconds faster than they had in 1992 while the fastest Ford driver in official qualifying Glenn Seton (the only Falcon runner in 1992) could only improve his 1992 time by 1.2 seconds.* The first driver to run against the clock, Neil Crompton, spun on oil coming into Caltex Chase on his fast lap. During his television interview upon returning to the pits, an angry Crompton said he was stunned to find oil flags waving going into the chase and questioned why the drivers were not told about the oil before the runoff started. As it happened, it was his own GIO Commodore that had been dropping the oil onto the track during both his warm up and official lap, causing grip problems for the next eight drivers to run. Only Perkins and a last out (due to an official mix-up) Dick Johnson said that they found none of the oil.

Race

Statistics
 Provisional Pole Position - #11 Larry Perkins - 2:12.86
 Pole Position – #11 Larry Perkins – 2:13.013
 Fastest Lap – #1 Mark Skaife – 2:14.803 (165.92 km/h) on lap 84
 Race time of winning car - 6:29:06.69 
 Winners' Average Speed – 154.51 km/h

See also
1993 Australian Touring Car season

References

External links
 Official V8 Supercar website
 Race results, www.touringcarracing.net, as archived at web.archive.org
 Race results, www.uniquecarsandparts.com.au
 Bathurst 1993 images, autopics.com.au

Motorsport in Bathurst, New South Wales
Tooheys 1000